Lucas Papaconstantinou is a Canadian former soccer player who played in The Football League, and the Canadian Professional Soccer League.

Playing career
Papaconstantinou began his career with Darlington F.C. of the Football League Two in 1997. He made his debut for the club on September 27, 1997 against Mansfield Town F.C. After one season in England he returned to Canada to sign with the Toronto Olympians of the Canadian Professional Soccer League. He made his debut for Toronto on June 7, 1998 in an Open Canada Cup match against the York Region Shooters. He helped the Olympians achieve a 10-game undefeated streak, before his departure from professional soccer in order to pursue a dental career.

References

External links

Living people
Association football goalkeepers
Canadian Soccer League (1998–present) players
Canadian soccer players
Darlington F.C. players
Soccer people from Ontario
English Football League players
Toronto (Mississauga) Olympians players
Canadian expatriate soccer players
Canadian expatriate sportspeople in England
Canadian people of Greek descent
Year of birth missing (living people)